Everything Is Dangerous But Nothing's Surprising is the debut album from Sydney-based rock band Body Type. The album was released on 20 May 2022.

The album was nominated for the 2022 Australian Music Prize.

Background and release
Body Type announced the release of their debut album, Everything Is Dangerous But Nothing's Surprising, on 10 February 2022, alongside the release of the album's first single: "Sex & Rage". The single was named after the Eve Babitz novel of the same name. A second single, "The Charm", was released on 28 April 2022. Vocalist and guitarist Sophie McComish said the song "[challenged] the male ego and [tried] to emulate it from a female perspective". The album was released on 20 May 2022 via Poison City Records. In an interview with 3RRR after the album's release, the band explored the experience of making music as women in a male-dominated music industry and how this was incorporated into the album.

Critical reception
The album was released to positive critical reception. The Australian radio station Double J placed it at 48 on their top 50 best albums of 2022 list, with writer Cassie Walker opining that the album produced a feeling of nostalgia through the different themes present throughout.

Track listing

References

2022 albums
Post-punk albums by Australian artists
Garage rock albums by Australian artists